National Executive Committee is the name of a leadership body in several organizations, mostly political parties:

 National Executive Committee of the African National Congress, in South Africa
 Australian Labor Party National Executive
 National Executive of the Bharatiya Janata Party, in India
 National Executive Committee of the Labour Party, in the United Kingdom
 National Executive Committee for Space-Based Positioning, Navigation and Timing (PNT), a United States Government organisation

See also 
 Central Executive Committee (disambiguation)
 Executive Committee (disambiguation)
 :Category:Executive committees of political parties
 
 Central committee
 Politburo
 Democratic National Committee, United States
 Republican National Committee, United States